Ada Martine Stolsmo Hegerberg (born 10 July 1995) is a Norwegian professional footballer who plays as a striker for the Division 1 Féminine club Lyon and the Norway national team.

Hegerberg has represented Norway at the youth international level, and made her debut for the senior team in 2011. In 2013, she was a part of the silver medalist team at the 2013 UEFA Women's Championship. She was on team Norway at the 2015 FIFA Women's World Cup, the 2017 UEFA Women's Championship and the 2022 UEFA Women's Championship.

Hegerberg was awarded the 2016 UEFA Best Women's Player in Europe Award on 25 August 2016, and in 2017 and 2019 was named BBC Women's Footballer of the Year. In 2018 she was the first-ever recipient of the Ballon d'Or Féminin. She holds the record for most goals in a UEFA Women's Champions League season (15), and is currently the all-time highest goalscorer in UEFA Women's Champions League (59).

Club career

Early career
Hegerberg was born in Molde, but grew up in Sunndalsøra where she played for Sunndal Fotball along with her older sister Andrine. In 2007, their family moved to Kolbotn, where the sisters later joined Kolbotn IL.

She made her debut for Kolbotn in 2010. On 6 August 2011, she scored three goals in seven minutes as Røa were beaten 4–1, with Andrine scoring the last goal. Aged 16, this made her the youngest player ever to have scored a hat-trick in Toppserien. While still 16 years old, she finished as Kolbotn's top scorer in the 2011 Toppserien season and was voted as the league's Young Player of the Year. Ahead of the 2012 season, both Hegerberg sisters joined Stabæk. During a match against Fart in May 2012, she scored five goals during the first half of Stabæk's 8–2 win. At this stage the sisters were considered to be two of the biggest talents in Norwegian women's football, and Ada won the Statoil "Talent of the Month" award for the second time in May 2012. She became top goalscorer in the 2012 Toppserien with 25 goals in 18 matches. She also contributed two goals in the semi-final of the 2012 Norwegian Women's Cup, when Amazon Grimstad were beaten 3–0. Stabæk's 4–0 final victory over Røa saw Hegerberg score a hat-trick.

In 2013, she and her sister signed contracts with the German side 1. FFC Turbine Potsdam until 30 June 2014, where they became teammates of their countrywoman Maren Mjelde. Hegerberg scored in her Bundesliga debut when SC Freiburg was beaten 3–1. In their first season in Germany, the Hegerbergs and Turbine finished second in both the 2012–13 Bundesliga and the 2012–13 DFB-Pokal.

Olympique Lyonnais
In the summer of 2014, she transferred to Olympique Lyonnais. Hegerberg had a very successful first season in France. She scored 26 goals in 22 league games, leading Lyon to a ninth consecutive Division 1 Féminine title. In the Coupe de France Féminine Final, Hegerberg scored the tying goal in the 47th minute, eventually culminating in a 2–1 victory over Montpellier.

Hegerberg returned to Lyon for the 2015–16 campaign. On 27 September, she scored a hat-trick in Lyon's 5–0 victory against rival PSG. Hegerberg became the first player to score a hat-trick against PSG since Julie Morel in October 2008. In November, Hegerberg reached an agreement on a contract extension to stay with the club through the 2019 season. Lyon retained the league title for the tenth time in a row on 8 May 2016. Hegerberg finishing the season as the top scorer of the league with 33 goals in 21 appearances. One week later, Hegerberg secured the Coupe de France with Lyon. In UEFA Women's Champions League action, Lyon went on to win the competition behind Hegerberg's 13 goals in 9 matches, to complete a treble.

On 3 December 2018, Hegerberg became the first ever winner of the Ballon d'Or Féminin. There was controversy during the ceremony, however, as the host, DJ Martin Solveig, asked Hegerberg upon receiving the award if she wanted to dance in celebration and "knew how to twerk", who in turn responded "no". His comments were criticised as sexist in the media; he later apologised for his remark. Regarding the incident, Hegerberg later commented: "He came to me afterwards and was really sad that it went that way. I didn’t really consider it sexual harassment or anything in the moment. I was just happy to do the dance and win the Ballon d’Or." Concerning her award, she also added: "It’s incredible. This is a great motivation to continue working hard and we will continue to work together to win more titles. I wanted to end with some words for young girls around the world: believe in yourselves."

Head to head with Paris Saint-Germain all season long, Lyon crushed their rivals 5–0 on 13 April 2019, with a goal and an assist for Hegerberg, a major individual performance. Lyon secured the title ten days later. After scoring the only goal of the Coupe de France semi-final against Grenoble Foot 38, Hegerberg was involved in two of the three goals in the final against Lille OSC, winning yet another competition.On 18 May 2019, Hegerberg delivered a Player of the Match performance in the 2019 UEFA Women's Champions League Final. With a hat-trick in just 16 minutes, she became the first player to score three goals in a UWCL final. Lyon completed the treble against Barcelona with a 4–1 victory, winning a fourth UWCL trophy in a row, a unique performance in modern football. By the end of the season, Hegerberg had won 13 out of 15 trophies possible in her stay with Lyon.

On 30 October 2019, she became the UEFA Women's Champions League all-time top scorer, after scoring her 53rd goal in her 50th appearance.

Hegerberg sustained an injury before Lyon were due to play Stade de Reims on 26 January 2020. It was later confirmed via an MRI scan that she had ruptured her anterior cruciate ligament. On 28 January, the club announced that she would miss at least the remainder of the season. In the wake of the COVID-19 breakthrough, the season was stopped only a few weeks after.

On 18 December 2020, she signed a contract extension with Lyon keeping her at the club through June 2024. It was said in a later press release from the club that Hegerberg would not be available before the start of the 2021–22 season.

On 5 October 2021, Hegerberg made her Lyon comeback after 21 months on the sideline, playing the final 12 minutes in Lyon's 3–0 win over BK Häcken in the opening match of the UEFA Champions League group stage. She scored her first goals post-injury on 14 November 2021, with a brace against arch-rival Paris Saint-Germain, in one of the biggest games in women's football.

In April 2022, she was instrumental in the qualification of her team to the final of the Champions League, being credited with an assist in a 3–2 victory at home against Paris Saint-Germain, and scoring the opening goal in a 2–1 win away, in a national record 43,000 fans at the Parc des Princes. In the final, she scored a goal and had an assist in a 3–1 win over Barcelona, to win her sixth title in the competition.

International career

At the age of 15, Hegerberg was on team Norway under-19 that played at the 2011 UEFA Women's U-19 Championship. She was also included in the squad for the final tournament, where Norway reached the final. Hegerberg was on team Norway that played at 2012 FIFA U-20 Women's World Cup into the quarter-final. She and Andrine scored the goals in a 2–1 win over Canada in the group stage. She made her senior debut for Norway as a substitute in a 3–1 defeat to Northern Ireland in Lurgan on 19 November 2011.

Hegerberg made her championship debut on team Norway that played at the 2013 UEFA Women's Championship; a 1–1 draw with Iceland on 11 July 2013. She scored her first goal in the tournament as Spain were defeated 3–1 in the quarter-final and played the entire 90 minutes as Norway lost the final 1–0 to Germany.

Hegerberg was on team Norway at the 2015 FIFA Women's World Cup. She scored three goals in three group stage games, highlighted by a two-goal performance in Norway 3–1 over Ivory Coast. Hegerberg was nominated for the Best Young Player Award for her efforts.

In January 2016, Hegerberg was awarded the 2015 Norwegian Gold Ball, given to the best footballer in Norway. The previous time it was awarded to a woman was 20 years earlier.

In the summer of 2017, Hegerberg decided to stop representing the national team as a form of protest due to a dispute with the NFF about how they treat women's football. Despite some improvements including the doubling of the remuneration pot for women, Hegerberg felt there was "still a long way to go" so has continued to refuse to be called up and missed the 2019 World Cup. She described her time with the national team "deeply depressing", giving her "nightmares" and leaving her "mentally broken".

In March 2022, Hegerberg ended her five year exile from the national team. On her first game back on 7 April, Hegerberg scored a hat-trick in a 5–1 win against Kosovo in the 2023 FIFA Women's World Cup qualification.

Personal life
In June 2019, Hegerberg married Thomas Rogne.

Views on COVID-19 impact on football
In May 2020, in an online interview with ESPN, Hegerberg said that women's football would suffer due to COVID-19 because it is the sport's "weakest link". "We're kind of at the stage where we're still in need of that help and when you see football as a whole and the men's football is struggling you can also imagine yourself how the women's football is affected of this." Hegerberg stressed not losing track of women's football, especially as positives have emerged in terms of support for the game: "We need to raise our voices obviously to keep the subject warm."

Sponsors and media
The Norwegian is one of the most in-demand athletes in the world. After being awarded the Ballon d'Or in 2018, Hegerberg became an ambassador for the watchmaker Hublot, as well as the financial technology company Mastercard. During the summer of 2019, after attending events such as the UEFA Champions League Final and the French Open for her sponsor Mastercard, she became the global ambassador of the Danone Nations Cup, the biggest international tournament of U12, for both girls and boys. In the summer of 2020, after six years collaborating with sports equipment supplier Puma, Nike and herself announced a long-term partnership. The American giant immediately elevated Hegerberg in multiple marketing campaigns, reinforcing its will to support activism, Hegerberg being known as a gender equality and sustainability activist.

Hegerberg has had a massive media impact over the past years, widely considered as the number one spokesperson for her sport, given the numerous interviews she gave for women's football.

On 19 November 2020, the US-based streaming platform ESPN+ published a documentary about Hegerberg: My Name is Ada Hegerberg.

Hegerberg has been named one of the most powerful women in sport by a number of media, including Sports Illustrated.

Career statistics

Club

International

Scores and results list Norway's goal tally first, score column indicates score after each Hegerberg goal.

Honours

Stabæk
Norwegian Women's Cup: 2012

Lyon
Division 1 Féminine (7): 2014–15, 2015–16, 2016–17, 2017–18, 2018–19, 2019–20, 2021–22
Coupe de France (5): 2014–15, 2015–16, 2016–17, 2018–19, 2019–20
UEFA Women's Champions League (6): 2015–16, 2016–17, 2017–18, 2018–19, 2019–20, 2021–22
Trophée des Championnes (2) : 2019, 2022

Norway
UEFA Women's Euro: runner-up 2013

Individual
UEFA Best Women's Player in Europe: 2016
UEFA Best Women's Player in Europe: runner-up 2018, 2019
Norwegian Sportsperson of the Year: 2016
FIFA FIFPro World XI: 2016
The 100 Best Female Footballers In The World Winner: 2016
BBC Women's Footballer of the Year: 2017, 2019
Ballon d'Or Féminin: 2018
The Best FIFA Women's Player – Third Place: 2018
The Best FIFA Women's Player – Nominated: 2019
IFFHS Women's World Team: 2018, 2019
Gullballen: 2015, 2016, 2018
IFFHS World's Woman Team of the Decade 2011–2020
IFFHS UEFA Woman Team of the Decade 2011–2020
UEFA Women's Champions League Best Goalscorer: 2016, 2018
Division 1 Féminine Best Goalscorer: 2016, 2017, 2018
Division 1 Féminine Best Player: 2016
2019 UEFA Women's Champions League Final Player of the Match
UEFA Women's Champions League Squad of the Season: 2015–16, 2017–18, 2018–19, 2021–22

Records
Most goals in the UEFA Women's Champions League: 59
Most goals in a UEFA Women's Champions League season: 15
Most goals in the UEFA Women's Champions League for a club: 55 (Olympique Lyonnais)
First footballer to score a hat-trick in a UEFA Women's Champions League final (single match)
First footballer to score in 4 different UEFA Women's Champions League finals (second to Alfredo di Stefano both men and women combined)
Quickest footballer to reach 50 goals both UEFA Women's Champions and UEFA Champions League combined (49 games)

Notes

References

External links

 
 
 
 Olympique Lyonnais player profile
 
 

1995 births
Living people
People from Molde
People from Sunndal
Norwegian women's footballers
Women's association football forwards
Kolbotn Fotball players
Stabæk Fotball Kvinner players
1. FFC Turbine Potsdam players
Olympique Lyonnais Féminin players
Toppserien players
Frauen-Bundesliga players
Division 1 Féminine players
Norway women's international footballers
2015 FIFA Women's World Cup players
Norwegian expatriate women's footballers
Norwegian expatriate sportspeople in Germany
Norwegian expatriate sportspeople in France
Expatriate women's footballers in Germany
Expatriate women's footballers in France
Sportspeople from Møre og Romsdal
UEFA Women's Euro 2022 players
UEFA Women's Euro 2017 players